A time bomb (or a timebomb, time-bomb) is a bomb whose detonation is triggered by a timer. The use (or attempted use) of time bombs has been for various purposes including insurance fraud, terrorism, assassination, sabotage and warfare. They are a popular feature in fictional thriller and action films as they offer a way of imparting a dramatic sense of urgency.

Construction

The explosive charge is the main component of any bomb, and makes up most of the size and weight of it. It is the damaging element of the bomb (along with any fragments or shrapnel the explosion might produce with its container or neighboring objects). The explosive charge is detonated by a detonator.

A time bomb's timing mechanism may be professionally manufactured either separately or as part of the device, or it may be improvised from an ordinary household timer such as a wind-up alarm clock, wrist watch, digital kitchen timer, or notebook computer. The timer can be programmed to count up or count down (usually the latter; as the bomb detonates when the time runs out).

Types
Types of time bombs include:
 Delay-action bomb (bombs dropped by aircraft with a delay to increase damage/disruption)
 Improvised explosive device ("home-made" bombs with a delay to allow the person placing the bomb to escape)
 Limpet mine (attached to enemy ships by naval divers)

List of notable incidents involving time bombs

See also
 Fuse (explosives)
 Ticking time bomb scenario (hypothetical justification of torture)
 Software time bomb

References

Bombs
Improvised explosive devices